Kewal Dhaliwal (born 7 October 1964) is a Punjabi playwright, theater director and president of Punjab Sangeet Natak Akademi Chandigarh. An alumnus of the National School of Drama, Dhaliwal has been active in theater for more than thirty-five years.

Life 
Kewal Dhaliwal was born in a village near Ajnala, Amritsar district, Punjab in the family of Shiv Singh and Mohinder Kaur.

In 1978, he joined the theatre group of Gursharan bhaji as an artist and worked there for ten years. In 1988, Kewal Dhaliwal joined the National School of Drama. Then he came to Amritsar and founded Punjabi Theatre Group Manch Rangmanch.

Plays

Play collections 
 Mavan
 Aje Taan Supne Sulghde
 Dhukhda Roh
 Jajbian De Aar Paar

Plays for children 
 Shahir Saleti
 Rajya Raj Krendya

Play 
 Itihas De Safe Te
 Sarkar e Khalsa
 Mera Rang De Basanti Chola

Edited play 
 Das Baal Natak
 Das Nukad Natak
 It Marg Pair Dreejai
 Purja Purja Kat Mare
 Bal Hua Bandhan Chhoote

Articles on theater 
 Rangkarmi Di Teesri Akhkh

Productions 
Nora (Navnindra Behl)
Ma (Maxim Gorki)
 Medni (Swaraj Bir)
 Shayari (Swaraj Bir )
 Kabir (S N Sewak)
 Kaidon ( Shahiryar )
 Kort Marshal ( Savdesh Deepak )
 Tasveeran (Swaraj Bir )
 Pul-sirat (Swaraj Bir )

References

Indian theatre directors
Indian male dramatists and playwrights
People from Amritsar district
Living people
1964 births
Dramatists and playwrights from Punjab, India
Recipients of the Sangeet Natak Akademi Award